Ciorbă is a Romanian surname that may refer to:

Corina Monica Ciorbă, better known as Corina, Romanian singer
Sandu Ciorbă (born 1968), Romanian Roma singer
Toma Ciorbă (1864–1936), Romanian physician and hospital director

Romanian-language surnames